Vlastos is a surname. Notable people with the surname include:

Sifis Vlastos (?), fifteenth century Cretan rebel
Gregory Vlastos (1907–1991), scholar of ancient philosophy
Kostia Vlastos (1883–1967) Greek scion of a family of bankers
Nichi Vlastos (born 2000), American soccer player

See also
Vlasto